Daphne brevituba is a shrub, of the family Thymelaeaceae.  It is native to China, specifically Western Yunnan.

Description
The shrub is evergreen, and grows to 1.0 meters tall. Its branches are pale-yellow, light brown, and nearly cylindrical in shape. Its leaves alternate, and are usually clustered at apices of branches.

It is often found in valley woodland areas at around 2000 meters in altitude. It flowers from March to April and bears fruit from April to May.

References

brevituba